Lalandusse is a commune in the Lot-et-Garonne department in south-western France. It is around 20 km south of Bergerac. It has 224 inhabitants (2019).

See also
 Communes of the Lot-et-Garonne department

References

Communes of Lot-et-Garonne